Ælfthryth ( – 1000 or 1001, also Alfrida, Elfrida or Elfthryth)  was Queen of the English from her marriage to King Edgar in 964 or 965 until Edgar's death in 975. Ælfthryth was the first wife of an English king known to have been crowned and anointed as queen. She had two sons with Edgar, the ætheling Edmund (who died young) and King Æthelred the Unready. Ælfthryth was a powerful political figure and possibly orchestrated the murder of her stepson, King Edward the Martyr, in order to place her son Æthelred on the throne. She appeared as a stereotypical bad queen and evil stepmother in many medieval histories.

Early life
Ælfthryth was the daughter of Ealdorman Ordgar. Her mother was a member of the royal family of Wessex. The family's power lay in the west of Wessex. Ordgar was buried in Exeter and his son Ordwulf founded, or refounded, Tavistock Abbey.

Ælfthryth was first married to Æthelwald, son of Æthelstan Half-King as recorded by Byrhtferth of Ramsey in his Life of Saint Oswald of Worcester. Later accounts, such as that preserved by William of Malmesbury, add vivid detail of unknown reliability.

According to William, the beauty of Ordgar's daughter Ælfthryth was reported to King Edgar. Edgar, looking for a Queen, sent Æthelwald to see Ælfthryth, ordering him "to offer her marriage [to Edgar] if her beauty were really equal to report." When she turned out to be just as beautiful as was said, Æthelwald married her himself and reported back to Edgar that she was quite unsuitable. Edgar was eventually told of this, and decided to repay Æthelwald's betrayal in like manner. He said that he would visit the poor woman, which alarmed Æthelwald. He asked Ælfthryth to make herself as unattractive as possible for the king's visit, but she did the opposite. Edgar, quite besotted with her, killed Æthelwald during a hunt.

The historical record does not record the year of Æthelwald's death, let alone its manner. No children of Æthelwald and Ælfthryth are known.

Queen consort
Edgar had two children before he married Ælfthryth, both of uncertain legitimacy. Edward was probably the son of Æthelflæd, and Eadgifu, later known as Saint Edith of Wilton, was the daughter of Wulfthryth. Sound political reasons encouraged the match between Edgar, whose power base was centred in Mercia, and Ælfthryth, whose family were powerful in Wessex. In addition to this, and her link with the family of Æthelstan Half-King, Ælfthryth also appears to have been connected to the family of Ælfhere, Ealdorman of Mercia.

Edgar married Ælfthryth in either 964 or 965. In 966 Ælfthryth gave birth to a son who was named Edmund. In King Edgar's charter (S 745) regranting privileges to New Minster, Winchester that same year, the infant Edmund is called "clito legitimus" (legitimate ætheling), and appears before Edward in the list of witnesses. Edmund died young,  970, but in 968 Ælfthryth had given birth to a second son who was called Æthelred.

King Edgar organised a second coronation on 11 May 973 at Bath, perhaps to bolster his claim to be ruler of all of Britain. Here Ælfthryth was also crowned and anointed, granting her a status higher than any recent queen. The only model of a queen's coronation was that of Judith of Flanders, but this had taken place outside England. In the new rite, the emphasis lay on her role as protector of religion and the nunneries in the realm. She took a close interest in the well-being of several abbeys, and as overseer of Barking Abbey she deposed and later reinstated the abbess.

Ælfthryth played a large role as forespeca, or advocate, in at least seven legal cases. As such, she formed a key part of the Anglo-Saxon legal system as a mediator between the individual and the crown, which was increasingly viewing its role in the courts as a symbol of its authority as protector of its subjects. Ælfthryth's actions as forespeca were largely for the benefit of female litigants, and her role as a mediator shows the possibilities for women to have legal and political power in late Anglo-Saxon England.

Queen dowager

Edgar died in 975 leaving two young sons, Edward and Æthelred. Edward was almost an adult, and his successful claim for the throne was supported by many key figures including Archbishops Dunstan and Oswald and the brother of Ælfthryth's first husband, Æthelwine, Ealdorman of East Anglia. Supporting the unsuccessful claim of Æthelred were Ælfthryth herself (now the Queen dowager) Bishop Æthelwold of Winchester, and Ælfhere, Ealdorman of Mercia.

According to the Anglo-Saxon Chronicle, King Edward was killed at Corfe Castle on 18 March 978, while visiting Ælfthryth. He was apparently killed by servants of the queen, leaving the way clear for her son Æthelred to be installed as king. As the king developed into a cult figure and martyr, a body of literature grew up around his murder, at first implying Ælfthryth's guilt and later accusing her outright. The 12th century monastic chronicle the Liber Eliensis went so far as to accuse her of being a witch, claiming that she had murdered not only the king, but also Abbot Brihtnoth of Ely.

Queen regent
Within a year of his brother's death Æthelred was confirmed as king of the English. Due to Æthelred's youth, Ælfthryth served as regent for her son until his coming of age about 984. She and her regency council ruled quietly, efficiently, with an iron fist. By 984 her earlier allies Æthelwold and Ælfhere had died, and Æthelred rebelled against his old advisers, preferring a group of younger nobility.
In charter S 745 mentioned earlier, dated to 966, Ælfthryth was identified as 'legitimate wife of the king', after being crowned queen in 973 she witnessed charters as "Ælfðryð regina". She was absent as a witness during the reign of her step-son King Edward, and during the minority of her son King Æthelred, again witnessed charters as "Ælfðryð regina" (see charter S 843). Towards the end of 983, when King Æthelred was beginning to assert his own authority, she began to sign charters as "Ælfthryth, mother of the king" (see charter S 845).

Later life
Ælfthryth disappears from the list of charter witnesses from around 984. About this time Æthelred married and there was a new queen in the court, Ælfgifu. Ælfthryth reappears as a witness in 993, again as 'mother of the king'. She remained an important figure, being responsible for the care of Æthelred's children by his first wife, Ælfgifu. Æthelred's eldest son, Æthelstan Ætheling, prayed for the soul of the grandmother "who brought me up" in his will in 1014.

Although her reputation was damaged by the murder of her stepson, Ælfthryth was a religious woman, taking an especial interest in monastic reform when Queen. In about 986 she founded Wherwell Abbey in Hampshire as a Benedictine nunnery, and late in life she retired there. In about 979, Ælfthryth had founded Amesbury Abbey. The date is given by the Chronicle of Melrose appropriate.

Antonia Gransden comments: "In their patronage of the monks both Cnut and Edward the Confessor were supported by their queens, Emma and Edith, who were worthy successors of Edgar's queen, Ælfthryth, as patronesses of the religious." She died at Wherwell on 17 November 999, 1000 or 1001.

Notes

References

 Higham, Nick, The Death of Anglo-Saxon England. Stroud: Sutton, 1997. 
 Miller, Sean, "Edgar" in Michael Lapidge (ed.),  The Blackwell Encyclopedia of Anglo-Saxon England. Oxford: Blackwell, 1999. 
 Lavelle, Ryan, Aethelred II: King of the English. Stroud: The History Press, 2008. 
 Stafford, Pauline, "Ælfthryth" in Michael Lapidge (ed.),  The Blackwell Encyclopedia of Anglo-Saxon England. Oxford: Blackwell, 1999. 
 Stafford, Pauline, Unification and Conquest: A Political and Social History of England in the Tenth and Eleventh Centuries. London: Edward Arnold, 1989.

External links 
 

940s births
1000 deaths
10th-century English nuns
Anglo-Saxon royal consorts
Anglo-Saxon nuns
House of Wessex
English royal consorts
Amesbury Abbey
Queen mothers